Flight 14P of SpaceShipOne was its third powered flight, which occurred on May 13, 2004.  The pilot was Mike Melvill.

Details
After ten seconds the rocket was lit, for a 55 second burn.

At one point during the flight, the avionics computer froze up and had to be rebooted. Melvill flew the aircraft manually until the computer became operable again.

During reentry, the craft attained Mach 1.9 and deceleration of 3.5 g (34 m/s²).  The craft switched to glider configuration at 55,000 feet (17.4 km). The craft returned to the spaceport and landed safely.

External links
 SpaceShipOne video footage (RealVideo)

SpaceShipOne
Scaled Composites Tier One program
2004 in spaceflight